Le Cygne is a one-act ballet, with choreography by Mariquita, a scenario by Catulle Mendès, and music by Charles Lecocq. It was first staged at the Opéra-Comique, Paris on 20 April 1899. It is loosely based on the classical myth of Leda and the Swan.

Cast
Pierrot – Mdlle. Pepa Invernizzi
La Dryade – Mdlle. Boni
Le Petit Faune – Mddle. Chasles
Léda – Mdlle. Dehelli
Le Chant du Cygne (singer) – Mdlle. Davies
Conductor: Alexandre Luigini
Source: 1899 piano score.

Synopsis

Pierrot has happened across Leda bathing in the river Eurotas. He falls in love with her, and returns at dawn the next day hoping to catch sight of her again. A little faun, seeing the boy's sadness, offers him wine, fruits, and flowers, and summons nymphs and dryads from the adjoining laurel grove. They dance round him while he plays on a pipe, but he remains inconsolable. When music is heard in the distance announcing the arrival of Leda, with her attendants, he drives away the nymphs, dryads, and faun, and conceals himself among the flowers. Leda prepares for her morning bath, expressing the hope that she will again meet the beautiful swan – Zeus in disguise – who often meets her at this spot. She and her women undress and plunge into the river; the swan appears, gliding towards Leda. The attendants raise their cloaks to hide from view the embrace with which the queen welcomes the bird; but Pierrot has seen all, and, furious with jealousy, he strikes the swan with his stick, inflicting a mortal wound, from which the bird soon dies, singing before he expires.

Struck with remorse, Pierrot runs to hide himself in the laurel grove, but Leda wounds him with an arrow. She then orders her attendants to place the swan on a litter of branches and flowers; the funeral procession moves off, leaving Pierrot alone, weeping despairingly. The faun returns and advises him to impersonate the swan. He is white like his dead rival, and his wide sleeves resemble wings. If the moon goddess Selene would only bring on a momentary eclipse of the sun the deception could be easily carried out. The sky darkens; Leda and her women return, and are astonished when another swan comes gliding on the river towards the queen. Night comes on suddenly, but soon daylight returns, and in a final apotheosis there appear huge eggs, from which hatch three little Pierrots with swans' wings on their backs.

Numbers

Introduction
Rêverie de Pierrot et pantomime 
Danse du petit faune
Danse des nymphes 
Pas de l'hamadryade
Ensemble des nymphes 
Cortège de Léda
Valse lente

Prière à Vénus
Scène du bain
Apparition du cygne
Le chant du cygne 
Pantomime
Cérémonie funèbre
Variation du petit faune
Ensemble final

Source: 1899 piano score.

Critical reception
The reviewer for The Era found the story ingenious, but too sexually explicit for the respectable audiences of the Opéra-Comique. He thought Lecocq's music "tuneful enough, but commonplace, jingling—by no means in harmony with M. Mendes' light, poetical, fantastic theme". The choreography and staging were praised.

References and sources

References

Sources
 

19th-century ballet premieres
Compositions by Charles Lecocq